Cloverdale Learning Centre is a public high school in Surrey, British Columbia part of School District 36 Surrey. It is a school providing an alternative schooling option, It is for students that struggle in or were removed from Mainstream schools.

Teachers give the students units to work on, and once they are done the unit, they do a test.

Students have a variety of times to come to the school: morning, afternoon.

They can work ahead to graduate faster, or go at their own pace. Most students go to school for 3 hours from Monday to Thursday, but some choose to go for 6 hours. However long the student goes, depends on the amount of work they want to get done. Teachers are around and are able to help the student if they need that extra help.

Students may choose to continue on to graduate at the centre or return to the mainstream school if approved by the School Administration.

References

Cloverdale Learning Centre
School District 36 Surrey School Profile: Cloverdale Learning Centre

External links
Provincial School Profile

High schools in British Columbia
Educational institutions in Canada with year of establishment missing